The 1989–90 St. Louis Blues season was the St. Louis Blues' 23rd season in the National Hockey League (NHL).

Offseason
Team captain Bernie Federko is traded to the Detroit Red Wings. Forward Rick Meagher is named team captain.

Regular season

Final standings

Schedule and results

Player statistics

Regular season
Scoring

Goaltending

Playoffs
Scoring

Goaltending

Playoffs

Awards and Records
 Frank J. Selke Trophy: || Rick Meagher
 Lady Byng Memorial Trophy: || Brett Hull
 NHL Plus/Minus Award: || Paul Cavallini, St. Louis Blues
 Brett Hull, Right Wing, NHL First Team All-Star
 Brett Hull, NHL goals leader, with 72

Draft picks
St. Louis's draft picks at the 1989 NHL Entry Draft held at the Met Center in Bloomington, Minnesota.

References
 Blues on Hockey Database

St.
St.
St. Louis Blues seasons
1989 in sports in Missouri
1990 in sports in Missouri